Faso Airways is an airline based in Ouagadougou, Burkina Faso. It was established in 2000 and operates charter flights to Africa, Europe and the Middle East.

Fleet 
 Airbus A310-300
 Ilyushin Il-76TD

See also		
 List of defunct airlines of Burkina Faso

References 

Defunct airlines of Burkina Faso
Airlines established in 2000